The women's 4 × 400 metres relay competition of the athletics events at the 2011 Pan American Games took place on the 28th October at the Telmex Athletics Stadium.  The defending Pan American Games champion were Aymée Martínez, Daimy Pernia, Zulia Calatayud and Indira Terrero of Cuba.

Records
Prior to this competition, the existing world and Pan American Games records were as follows:

Qualification
Each National Olympic Committee (NOC) was able to enter one team.

Schedule

Results
All times shown are in seconds.

Final
Held on October 28.

References

Athletics at the 2011 Pan American Games
2011
2011 in women's athletics